The 2018 European Triathlon Championships were held in Glasgow, United Kingdom, from 9 to 11 August 2018. The championships were part of the first European Championships with six other sports events taking place in Glasgow and Berlin.

Events

Medal table

References

External links

Results book − Triathlon 

European Triathlon Championships
International sports competitions in Glasgow
Triathlon
European Triathlon Championships
European Championships
Triathlon